Nebria lariollei gaudini is a subspecies of beetle in the family Carabidae that is endemic to France.

References

External links
Nebria lariollei gaudini at Fauna Europaea

Beetles described in 1942
Endemic beetles of Metropolitan France